Sir Robert William Newman, 1st Baronet (18 August 1776 – 24 January 1848) was a British Whig politician. He was elected as one of the two Members of Parliament (MPs) for Bletchingley at a by-election in December 1812.

He held that seat until the 1818 general election, when he was returned for Exeter, and held the seat until the 1826 general election, which he did not contest.

He was created a baronet of Stokeley and of Mamhead in the County of Devon in 1836. He lived at Mamhead House, which he had built in the 1820s, employing Anthony Salvin as architect. He died, aged 71, and was succeeded by Sir Robert Lydston Newman, 2nd Baronet, who was killed in action at the battle of Inkerman.

References

External links 
 

1776 births
1848 deaths
Baronets in the Baronetage of the United Kingdom
Members of the Parliament of the United Kingdom for Exeter
UK MPs 1812–1818
UK MPs 1818–1820
UK MPs 1820–1826
Whig (British political party) MPs for English constituencies